Ukhta Airport (also referred to as Ust Ukhta)  is a civilian airport in Russia located 5 km east of Ukhta (near Sosnogorsk).  It services medium-sized airliners.

Airlines and destinations

References

External links

Airports built in the Soviet Union
Airports in the Komi Republic